Turčianske Teplice District (okres Turčianske Teplice) is a district in the Žilina Region of central Slovakia. 
Until 1920, the district was part of Turóc County, Kingdom of Hungary.

Municipalities 
Abramová
Blažovce
Bodorová
Borcová
Brieštie
Budiš
Čremošné
Dubové
Háj
Horná Štubňa
Ivančiná
Jasenovo
Jazernica
Kaľamenová
Liešno
Malý Čepčín
Moškovec
Mošovce
Ondrašová
Rakša
Rudno
Sklené
Slovenské Pravno
Turček
Turčianske Teplice
Veľký Čepčín

External links 
Official site

Districts of Slovakia
Žilina Region